Tmemophlebia is a genus of bee flies in the family Bombyliidae. There are about 16 described species in Tmemophlebia.

Species
These 16 species belong to the genus Tmemophlebia:

 Tmemophlebia aldrichi 
 Tmemophlebia amplicella 
 Tmemophlebia anoexis 
 Tmemophlebia borealis 
 Tmemophlebia coquilletti 
 †Tmemophlebia carolinae  (Eocene)
 Tmemophlebia cyanoceps 
 Tmemophlebia krypton 
 Tmemophlebia melanofemur 
 Tmemophlebia mexicana 
 Tmemophlebia moctezuma 
 Tmemophlebia painterorum 
 Tmemophlebia psammonoma 
 Tmemophlebia testacea 
 Tmemophlebia tzahui 
 Tmemophlebia vockerothi 
 Tmemophlebia xanthotibia

References

Further reading

 

Bombyliidae
Articles created by Qbugbot